REV TV Canada is a Canadian English language exempt Category B specialty channel owned by REV Sports Entertainment Inc. The channel broadcasts programs related to motorsports and other automotive shows.

History
In May 2015, Anthem Sports & Entertainment announced that it had reached an agreement with Lucas Oil to launch its MAVTV-branded channel in Canada as a localized Canadian channel. Despite the announcement, no expected launch date was specified by either party as no agreements with television service providers were reached at that point. 

In December 2016, the channel's parent company announced that it had reached an agreement with the Canadian Cable Systems Alliance (CCSA), allowing the channel to become available for distribution to its membership of independent Canadian cable television service providers, which would see the channel launch on January 10, 2017. The press release announcing the launch of the channel excluded any reference to Anthem Sports & Entertainment; instead referencing REV Sports Entertainment Inc., now the owner of the channel. Heading the channel was Mike Garrow, referenced in the original press release in 2015 announcing the licensing agreement with Anthem Sports & Entertainment, who at the time would "oversee the rollout and launch of MAVTV Canada, working with Anthem's technical and production teams." 

The channel launched as expected on January 10, 2017 through several CCSA members as MAVTV Canada under licence from Lucas Oil. In June 2017, the channel launched in high definition, with Tbaytel, the largest distributor of the channel at the time. Less than a month later, the channel was launched on Eastlink. The channel was subsequently launched on additional providers since.

In May 2020, the channel was renamed REV TV Canada, ending the licensing deal with Lucas Oil. REV TV Canada is now available to over 6 million households across Canada and features over 200 races from around the world. The channel showcases all forms of racing, such as MotoGP, World Rally Championship, AMA Supercross Championship, All Star Circuit of Champions, AMSOIL National Sprint Car Championship, Indy Lights, Super Formula, Castrol® FloRacing Night In America, AMSOIL Championship Snocross, 400 Thunder Drag Racing, ARCA Midwest Tour, SPEED SPORT TV, along with news coverage such as The Inside Line (F1), Winged Nation, and Tuning 365 Performance Auto & Sound Magazine. REV TV Canada also produces original programming with REV Culture and All North Racing, and features a variety of lifestyle programs that feature prominent interviews, how-to and behind-the-scenes features, and more. REV TV Canada brands itself as "YOUR MOTORSPORTS & AUTOMOTIVE DESTINATION 24/7."

In June 2022, REV TV Canada was added to Rogers Ignite TV (channel 540) making the channel available on nearly every major TV provider in Canada.

Programming 

 All Star Circuit of Champions
 AMA Supercross Championship
 ARCA Midwest Tour
 European Rally Championship
 Extreme E
 FIA World Endurance Championship
 FIA World Rallycross Championship
 Grand Prix motorcycle racing
 IMSA
 Indy Lights
 Isle of Man TT
 Monster Jam
 Race of Champions
 Sidecarcross World Championship
 Speed Sport
 Superbike World Championship
 Super Formula Championship
 United States Auto Club
 World Rally Championship

References

External links
 REV TV Canada

Digital cable television networks in Canada
Television channels and stations established in 2017
English-language television stations in Canada
Sports television networks in Canada